Andrea Syrtash is a New-York based dating and relationship writer, online broadcaster, and author.

Author

Syrtash contributed to a number of titles published by Hundreds of Heads Books and served as the Special Editor of How to Survive the Real World (2006) and How to Survive Your In-Laws. She is the author of He's Just Not Your Type (And That's a Good Thing) (Rodale Books, 2010) and Cheat On Your Husband (With Your Husband) (Rodale Books, 2011). She is the co-author of It's Okay to Sleep with Him on the First Date (Harlequin Non-Fiction, July 2013).

On-air personality

Syrtash hosted ON Dating,  produced by NBC Universal Digital Studios at 30 Rockefeller Center in New York City. She is the host of Love and Sex Videos for NBC iVillage and the co-host of Life Story Project  for OWN: The Oprah Winfrey Network (Canada).

She frequently appears in the media as a relationship expert source on shows including The View, The Today Show, CBS This Morning, CNN Headline News, On-Air with Ryan Seacrest, and on VH1.

Spokesperson and speaker

Syrtash has been a spokesperson and speaker for lifestyle brands including  MSN Living,  Schick Quattro for Women, and Movado.

Personal life

Syrtash grew up in Toronto, Ontario, Canada.  She lives in Brooklyn, NY with her husband Michael.

References

External links 
Andrea Syrtash's Official Site
OnDating Site
Harlequin Books Author Biography
ABCNews Appearance
Toronto Sun Book Review
Today Show appearance
Oprah.com article

Canadian self-help writers
Living people
Current TV people
Writers from Toronto
Canadian emigrants to the United States
Canadian expatriate writers in the United States
Writers from Brooklyn
Queen's University at Kingston alumni
Toronto Metropolitan University alumni
21st-century Canadian women writers
21st-century Canadian non-fiction writers
Canadian women non-fiction writers
Year of birth missing (living people)